Uništa is a village in the municipality of Bosansko Grahovo, Bosnia and Herzegovina.

Demographics 
According to the 2013 census, its population was 176.

References

Populated places in Bosansko Grahovo